Fernando Marroquin (born 19 April 1968) is a Guatemalan former swimmer who competed in the 1984 Summer Olympics.

References

1968 births
Living people
Guatemalan male swimmers
Guatemalan male freestyle swimmers
Male breaststroke swimmers
Olympic swimmers of Guatemala
Swimmers at the 1984 Summer Olympics